Charles Symonds Leaf (13 November 1895 in Marylebone – 19 February 1947) was a British sailor who competed in the 1936 Summer Olympics.

In 1936 he was a crew member of the British boat Lalage which won the gold medal in the 6 metre class. His daughter Freydis went on to be one of the first women to qualify for RAF wings.

References

External links
 
 
 
 

1895 births
1947 deaths
British male sailors (sport)
Olympic sailors of Great Britain
Olympic gold medallists for Great Britain
Olympic medalists in sailing
English Olympic medallists
Sailors at the 1936 Summer Olympics – 6 Metre
Medalists at the 1936 Summer Olympics
Alumni of Trinity College, Cambridge